Same-sex marriage in Illinois has been legally recognized since a law signed by Governor Pat Quinn on November 20, 2013 took effect on June 1, 2014. Same-sex marriage legislation was introduced in successive sessions of the Illinois General Assembly from 2007 to 2013. It passed the Senate in February 2013, but legislators delayed a vote in the House while lobbying for votes until November 5, 2013, when the House passed an amended version of the bill by a narrow margin. The Senate quickly approved the amended bill and Governor Quinn signed it into law on November 20. The law went into effect (statewide) on June 1, 2014, with same-sex couples able to apply for marriage licenses and then marry after the mandatory one-day waiting period.

On February 21, 2014, a U. S. District Court judge ruled that same-sex couples in Cook County could marry immediately and need not wait for the law to take effect on June 1. On February 26, 2014, Champaign County clerk officials, citing the Cook County ruling, began issuing marriage licenses to same-sex couples. An opinion by the Illinois Attorney General on March 4 announced that the ruling could apply to any county clerk who chose to issue marriage licenses to same-sex couples. Eight counties were issuing licenses by March 12: Cass, Champaign, Cook, Grundy, Jackson, Macon, McLean, and St. Clair. By April 15, that number had grown to 16 counties.

Illinois established civil unions on June 1, 2011, after Governor Quinn signed legislation on January 31, 2011. The law allows both same-sex and opposite-sex couples to form civil unions and provides state recognition of substantially similar legal relationships, including same-sex marriages and civil unions, entered into in other jurisdictions.

Background
On October 20, 1975, Nancy Davis and Toby Schneiter requested a marriage license in Cook County. The marriage bureau refused, and the couple subsequently staged a sit-in and a hunger strike. After attempts by deputies to remove them, the couple were arrested and put in the county lock-up overnight. The next morning, instead of showing up for their court appearance, they went back to the marriage bureau for another sit-in. This time, they were jailed for a week, during which they continued their hunger strike. By summer 1976, the couple had spent more than 120 days in jail. They were sentenced to a year in prison, but only served 6 months in the Cook County Jail.

In 1989, a couple from Chicago, Rex Wockner and Paul Varnell, filed a complaint with the Illinois Department of Human Rights, alleging that the state discriminated on the basis of sex because it refused to allow same-sex marriages. On February 14, 1990, Buddy Bell and Dale Fecker applied for and were denied a marriage license in Cook County. The couple, along with others, protested and were arrested. The Cook County State's Attorney indicated it was not going to prosecute, and the judge had the arrests stricken. 

In 1996, because Hawaii seemed poised to legalize same-sex marriage, the Illinois Marriage and Dissolution of Marriage Act was amended to prohibit marriage between two individuals of the same sex, and state that "marriage between 2 individuals of the same sex is contrary to the public policy of this State". This was repealed in 2014. Attempts to add language banning same-sex marriage to the State Constitution have not been successful.

Civil unions
Representative Greg Harris introduced the Illinois Religious Freedom Protection and Civil Unions Bill to the Illinois General Assembly on February 23, 2007. It aimed to make the creation, benefits, and dissolution of civil unions essentially identical to marriage. The bill was not brought to a vote before the House. On February 18, 2009, Harris re-introduced the civil union bill, which was reported out of committee following a 4–3 vote along party lines, with Democrats in support and Republicans opposed, but died on the floor. Instead of proceeding with that bill, the Youth and Family Committee substituted its language in a bill already before the committee on May 26, 2009. On November 30, 2010, the Illinois House of Representatives passed the bill by a vote of 61–52. The Senate approved it on December 1 by a vote of 32–24. Governor Pat Quinn signed the legislation on January 31, 2011, and it went into effect on June 1, 2011.

Following Governor Quinn's signature of the 2013 law that legalized same-sex marriage in Illinois, civil unions remain in effect and operative for both opposite-sex and same-sex couples. Couples who want to convert their civil union to a marriage can do so, with or without performing a new ceremony, for up to one year from the date that the marriage law took effect (i.e. until June 1, 2015). Those couples were exempt from paying a fee. The date of the marriage was recorded as the date of the original civil union. Couples who waited longer than one year have to perform a new ceremony and pay a fee.

Statistics
About 3,700 civil union licenses were issued in Illinois from June to December 2011. Of these, 1,856 (about 50.2%) were performed in Cook County, of which 138 were to heterosexual couples.

Same-sex marriage legislation
On February 22, 2007, Representative Greg Harris introduced the Religious Freedom and Marriage Fairness Bill to the Illinois House of Representatives, which would have provided for same-sex marriage in the state. The bill died in committee. On January 14, 2009, Harris reintroduced the bill in the new session, but it once again died in committee. In October that year, Senator Heather Steans introduced the Equal Marriage Bill, the first same-sex marriage bill filed in the Senate, but it too died in committee.

In February 2012, Harris introduced his bill again. On December 13, Harris and Steans announced plans for the General Assembly to consider the legislation before it dissolved early in January 2013. On January 2, 2013, at the end of the 97th General Assembly, Steans re-introduced her bill as an amendment to an unrelated Senate bill. After a legislative misstep, she again introduced the legislation as an amendment, this time to a House bill. The Senate Executive Committee approved the amendment on January 3, 2013, sending it to the  Senate for a floor vote, but the bill fell with the beginning of the 98th General Assembly on January 9.

Steans and Harris filed new bills on January 9, and 10, respectively. Steans' bill (Senate Bill 10) was approved by the Senate Executive Committee on February 5, 2013. On February 14, 2013, the Senate approved the bill in a 34–21 vote. Governor Pat Quinn said he would sign the bill into law if the House of Representatives also passed it. On February 26, 2013, the Illinois House Executive Committee approved the bill by a 6–5 vote. Harris, anticipating its defeat, did not call for a vote before the General Assembly adjourned on May 31, but instead extended the deadline for its approval until August 31, allowing for it to be considered by a special session if Governor Quinn identified it for consideration should he call the Assembly into special session as expected. A special session was held on pension reform; the same-sex marriage bill, however, was not included. Instead, LGBT organizations and the bill's sponsors focused instead on increasing support for the legislation, with the goal of holding a vote in the October and November veto session of the House and Senate.

The House of Representatives passed the bill legalizing same-sex marriage by a 61–54 vote on November 5, 2013, narrowly achieving the 60-vote threshold. The state Senate quickly approved the amended bill by a 32–21 vote margin and Governor Quinn signed the bill into law on November 20. The law went into effect on June 1, 2014, enabling same-sex couples to request marriage licenses on that date and perform ceremonies, after the mandatory one-day waiting period, from June 2, 2014, although a court allowed a same-sex couple to be married on November 27, 2013. Illinois statutes now read:

Reactions and commentary
In February 2012, the Mayor of Chicago, Rahm Emanuel, announced that he would work for the passage of a same-sex marriage bill. Governor Quinn said he was looking forward to building a majority for the legislation, and reiterated his support for same-sex marriage on May 11, 2012. A spokesman for the Catholic Conference of Illinois reiterated its opposition and said he was unaware of any legislators whose positions had changed. Another opponent, Senator Tim Bivins, noted that in comparable lame-duck legislative sessions, Governor Quinn had rewarded legislators who changed their votes with positions in his administration. On December 29, a spokesman for President Barack Obama reported his endorsement of the legislation: "While the president does not weigh in on every measure being considered by state legislatures, he believes in treating everyone fairly and equally, with dignity and respect. As he has said, his personal view is that it's wrong to prevent couples who are in loving, committed relationships, and want to marry, from doing so. Were the President still in the Illinois State Legislature, he would support this measure that would treat all Illinois couples equally."

On January 1, 2013, the Archbishop of Chicago, Francis, Cardinal George, in a letter to Roman Catholic parishioners wrote that enacting same-sex marriage was "acting against the common good of society", adding, "The state has no power to create something that nature itself tells us is impossible." For several weeks, the state Republican Chairman, Pat Brady, lobbied legislators to support the legislation, calling it "an issue of equality and we're the party of Lincoln", but other party leaders called for his resignation.

On January 10, Methodist Bishop Sally Dyck endorsed the legislation, saying that "[m]arriage equality is a civil rights issue", even though her church forbids her from celebrating such marriages. A group of business leaders, including representatives of Google, Orbitz, and Morningstar, Inc., on January 13 asked legislators to consider the economic advantages of enacting same-sex marriage, noting that "human capital drives innovation and growth" and "[m]arriage equality would strengthen the workforces of Illinois employers".

On November 5, President Obama tweeted "This is huge...the Illinois House just passed marriage equality." The White House also released a statement by the President stating: "As President, I have always believed that gay and lesbian Americans should be treated fairly and equally under the law. Over time, I also came to believe that same-sex couples should be able to get married like anyone else. So tonight, Michelle and I are overjoyed for all the committed couples in Illinois whose love will now be as legal as ours – and for their friends and family who have long wanted nothing more than to see their loved ones treated fairly and equally under the law." Chicago Mayor Rahm Emanuel tweeted his reaction: "With one vote, countless couples will be acknowledged for what they are under the law – families just like everyone else. Great day!"

Bishop Larry D. Trotter of the Sweet Holy Spirit Church in Chicago, who helped lead opposition to the bill, applauded legislators "who stood up for God. Regardless of the passage of SB10, we will always believe that marriage is between one man and one woman.", Trotter said. "Yet we will still love the members of the LGBT community. We pray God's Grace, Mercy and Blessings over the state of Illinois and the United States of America."

Lawsuits
On May 30, 2012, both Lambda Legal and the American Civil Liberties Union announced lawsuits in state court, Darby v. Orr and Lazaro v. Orr, challenging the refusal of the Cook County Clerk's Office headed by David Orr to issue marriage licenses to same-sex couples. Both contended that the Illinois Marriage and Dissolution of Marriage Act violated the Illinois Constitution's guarantees of equal protection and due process. The Illinois Attorney General, Lisa Madigan, announced the next day that her office would support the lawsuits, and Orr supported same-sex marriage. The Cook County State's Attorney, Anita Alvarez, had also conceded that the state's ban on same-sex marriages was unconstitutional. On July 3, the Chancery Division of the Circuit Court of Cook County approved the request of two county clerks from other parts of the state, represented by the Thomas More Society, a conservative legal group, to intervene to defend the Act. On November 30, it denied requests by the Church of Christian Liberty, the Grace Gospel Fellowship, and the Illinois Family Institute, opponents of same-sex marriage, to be allowed to intervene to defend the law.

In July 2013, following the U.S. Supreme Court's decision in United States v. Windsor, the plaintiffs in both cases filed motions for summary judgment, asking for a swift ruling in favor of same-sex marriage in Illinois. Circuit Judge Sophia Hall heard arguments on August 6 and rejected a motion to dismiss the case on September 27. Both cases were dismissed on December 17.

In November 2013, Judge Thomas M. Durkin ordered that a lesbian couple, long-time activist and civil servant Vernita Gray and her partner Patricia Ewert, be allowed to marry because Gray was terminally ill. On December 6, four same-sex couples filed a lawsuit, Lee v. Orr, in federal district court seeking the right to marry without waiting for the law to take effect on June 1, 2014. Two of the couples included a partner suffering from a serious illness. On December 10, Judge Sharon Johnson Coleman of the U.S. District Court for the Northern District of Illinois ruled that any same-sex couple could marry if one of the partners was terminally ill. On February 21, 2014, she ruled that same-sex couples could begin marrying in Cook County immediately without waiting for the Illinois statute legalizing same-sex marriage to take effect on June 1.

Response to decision in Lee v. Orr 
Cook County Clerk David Orr announced his office would accept applications for marriage licenses immediately. His office fulfilled 46 requests for marriage licenses from same-sex couples that day. On February 26, 2014, Champaign County clerk officials, citing the ruling in Lee v. Orr, began issuing marriage licenses to same-sex couples, and Grundy County followed suit on February 27.

The Macon County clerk asked the Attorney General if he could issue licenses to same-sex couples. In response, on March 4, Attorney General Madigan issued an opinion which stated that the Lee decision did not require county clerks to do so, but that lawsuits similar to Lee would produce the same result. She left the decision to the individual county clerk but made her own interpretation clear: "the Lee decision, along with the federal court decisions noted above, should be persuasive as you evaluate whether to issue marriage licenses to same-sex couples". Governor Quinn said that on the basis of Madigan's statement the Illinois Department of Public Health would record marriages issued by any county clerk. LGBT advocates said Madigan's statement "green lights" county clerks to issue the licenses. St. Clair County began issuing licenses to same-sex couples the next day, and officials in Cass and Jackson counties said they would do so too. Macon County announced it would issue such licenses beginning on March 10, and officials in McLean County said their start date was March 24. Officials in Lake, DeKalb, Kane, DuPage, and McHenry counties said they would wait until June 1, the effective date of the state statute. How clerks in most of Illinois' 102 counties would respond was not immediately clear, but Illinois couples were able to apply for a marriage license from any county, and some couples who lived in other counties had obtained licenses in Cook County. On March 12, Jackson County became the first county in Southern Illinois (south of the St. Louis metro area) to issue marriage licenses to same-sex couples.

Marriage statistics
As of April 18, 2016, more than 9,200 same-sex couples had received marriage licenses in Cook County (from February 2014), with projections that the number of marriage licenses issued to same-sex couples would reach over 10,000 by summer 2016. The 10,000th same-sex marriage license in Cook County was issued on August 31. In 2014, same-sex marriages accounted for approximately 17% of the total number of marriages performed in Cook County, though this number dropped to 7% in 2015. From June 2014 to April 18, 2016, Lake County issued a total of 382 same-sex marriage licenses, while Kane County issued 360 such licenses. Not all counties in Illinois record the number of marriage licenses issued to same-sex couples.

Public opinion
{| class="wikitable"
|+style="font-size:100%" | Public opinion for same-sex marriage in Illinois
|-
! style="width:190px;"| Poll source
! style="width:200px;"| Date(s)administered
! class=small | Samplesize
! Margin oferror
! style="width:100px;"| % support
! style="width:100px;"| % opposition
! style="width:40px;"| % no opinion
|-
| Public Religion Research Institute
| align=center| March 8–November 9, 2021
| align=center| ?
| align=center| ?
|  align=center| 74%
| align=center| 25%
| align=center| 1%
|-
| Public Religion Research Institute
| align=center| January 7–December 20, 2020
| align=center| 1,577 random telephoneinterviewees
| align=center| ?
|  align=center| 72%
| align=center| 26%
| align=center| 2%
|-
| Public Religion Research Institute
| align=center| April 5–December 23, 2017
| align=center| 2,452 random telephoneinterviewees
| align=center| ?
|  align=center| 65%
| align=center| 25%
| align=center| 10%
|-
| Public Religion Research Institute
| align=center| May 18, 2016–January 10, 2017
| align=center| 3,587 random telephoneinterviewees
| align=center| ?
|  align=center| 62%
| align=center| 29%
| align=center| 9%
|-
| Public Religion Research Institute
| align=center| April 29, 2015–January 7, 2016
| align=center| 2,936 random telephoneinterviewees
| align=center| ?
|  align=center| 60%
| align=center| 33%
| align=center| 7%
|-
| New York Times/CBS News/YouGov
| align=center| September 20–October 1, 2014
| align=center| 3,955 likely voters
| align=center| ± 1.9%
|  align=center| 55%
| align=center| 33%
| align=center| 14%
|-
| Public Religion Research Institute
| align=center| April 2, 2014–January 4, 2015
| align=center| 1,822 random telephoneinterviewees
| align=center| ?
|  align=center| 59%
| align=center| 34%
| align=center| 7%
|-
| Public Religion Research Institute
| align=center| November 12–December 18, 2013
| align=center| 157 random telephoneinterviewees
| align=center| ± 9.1%
|  align=center| 52%
| align=center| 39%
| align=center| 9%
|-
| Fako & Associates, Inc.
| align=center| October 8–10, 2013
| align=center| 600 likely voters
| align=center| ± 3.94%
|  align=center| 52%
| align=center| 40%
| align=center| 8%
|-
| Public Policy Crain/Ipsos Illinois
| align=center| February 12–15, 2013
| align=center| 600 adults
| align=center| ± 4.7%
|  align=center| 50%
| align=center| 29%
| align=center| 20%
|-
| Public Policy Polling
| align=center| November 26–28, 2012
| align=center| 625 registered voters
| align=center| ± 4.4%
|  align=center| 47%
| align=center| 42%
| align=center| 11%
|-
| Copley News Service
| align=center| 2004
| align=center| 625 registered voters
| align=center| ± 4%
| align=center| 27%
|  align=center| 60%
| align=center| 13%
|-

See also
 LGBT rights in Illinois
 Same-sex marriage law in the United States by state

Notes

References

External links
Illinois Religious Freedom Protection and Civil Union Act, Illinois General Assembly
Religious Freedom and Marriage Fairness Act, Illinois General Assembly

LGBT rights in Illinois
Illinois
2014 in LGBT history
2014 in Illinois